Morozovka is a rural locality (a khutor) in Semyonovskoye Rural Settlement, Kalacheyevsky District, Voronezh Oblast, Russia. The population was 135 as of 2010. There are 3 streets.

Geography 
Morozovka is located 38 km west of Kalach (the district's administrative centre) by road. Semyonovka is the nearest rural locality.

References 

Rural localities in Kalacheyevsky District